East Wakefield is an unincorporated community in the town of Wakefield in Carroll County, New Hampshire. Balch Pond and Ivanhoe Pond are also nearby. The area is a popular summer home location.

East Wakefield has a different ZIP code (03830) from the rest of the town of Wakefield.

References

Unincorporated communities in New Hampshire
Unincorporated communities in Carroll County, New Hampshire
Wakefield, New Hampshire